IGA or IgA may refer to:

Businesses and organizations 
 IGA (supermarkets) (initially Independent Grocers Alliance), a name used by many independent supermarkets throughout the world
 IGA (Australian supermarket group), the local Australian variant of the international IGA
 International Island Games Association, an organization that organizes the Island Games (a friendly competition between teams from several islands and other small territories)
 International Grenfell Association, an organization providing health care, education, religious and other services to the fishermen and coastal communities in Newfoundland and Labrador
 Interscope-Geffen-A&M, an American record label
 Irish Games Association, a non-profit body which is dedicated to promoting gaming in Ireland
 International Gay Association, the original name of the International Lesbian, Gay, Bisexual, Trans and Intersex Association

In government 
 Illinois General Assembly
 Indiana General Assembly
 Iowa General Assembly

In science and technology 
 Immunoglobulin A (IgA), an antibody playing a critical role in mucosal immunity
 Intergranular attack, another term for intergranular corrosion (a form of corrosion where the boundaries of crystallites of the material are more susceptible to corrosion than their insides)

Other uses 
 Identity Governance and Administration, the organisational policies, processes and procedures controlling identity management  
 In-game advertising, the use of computer and video games as a medium in which to deliver advertising
 International Gamers Award, an award for strategy board games and historical simulation games
 Islamic Golden Age, a period in the history of the Muslim world
 Koji Igarashi, a Japanese video game producer, nicknamed IGA

See also
Iga (disambiguation)